The 2003 Hamilton Tiger-Cats season was the 46th season for the team in the Canadian Football League and their 54th overall. The Tiger-Cats finished in 4th place in the East Division with a 1–17 record, which set the record for most regular season losses in professional Canadian football history. With a .059 record, the Tiger-Cats set a CFL record for worst winning percentage and are only second to the 1949 Hamilton Wildcats in Canadian football history who went winless in 1949. They also tied the 1954 and 1961 BC Lions and 1959 Saskatchewan Roughriders for fewest wins in CFL history.

Offseason

CFL Draft

Preseason

Regular season

Season standings

Season schedule

Awards and records

2003 CFL All Stars

Eastern Division All-Star selections

References

Hamilton Tiger-Cats seasons
Hamilton
Hamilton Tiger-cats Season, 2003
Hamilton Tiger-Cats